Helen Wills defeated Simonne Mathieu 6–3, 6–4 in the final to win the women's singles tennis title at the 1929 French Championships.

Seeds
The seeded players are listed below. Helen Wills is the champion; others show the round in which they were eliminated.

 Helen Wills (champion)
 Bobbie Heine Miller (quarterfinals)
 Phoebe Holcroft Watson (quarterfinals)
 Eileen Bennett (semifinals)
 Kornelia Bouman (first round)
 Simonne Mathieu (finalist)
 Cilly Aussem (semifinals)
 Irmgard Rost (third round)

Draw

Key
 Q = Qualifier
 WC = Wild card
 LL = Lucky loser
 r = Retired

Finals

Earlier rounds

Section 1

Section 2

Section 3

Section 4

References

External links
 

1929 in women's tennis
1929
1929 in French women's sport
1929 in French tennis